Atteria drucei is a species of moth of the family Tortricidae. It is found in Panama.

References

Moths described in 1914
Atteriini
Moths of Central America